5054 may refer to:

 The year 5054 BC
 The year 5054 AD
 The planet 5054 Keil
 Florida State Road 5054